Veeraballe is a village in Vinjamur mandal, located in YSR Kadapa district of the Indian state of Andhra Pradesh.

References 

Villages in Kadapa district